John Paul II High School is a private Roman Catholic college preparatory high school in Schertz, Texas.  It is operated by the Roman Catholic Archdiocese of San Antonio.

History
St. John Paul II was established in 2009, to serve the families in the New Braunfels, Schertz, and the Comal County area. Planning began in 2005 and after two years of planning and outreach in the surrounding parishes, they met with Archbishop Gomez about the possibility of this new school. He not only supported the budding new Catholic high school but requested it be opened as an Archdiocesan school. In August 2008, the Archdiocese bought 53 acres located on the corner of Friesenhahn Road and FM 482. In December the Comal Elementary 16 acre campus across the street was purchased by the school from Comal ISD. The school officially opened  August 17, 2009 with 34 students and 10 part-time and full-time teachers under the name John Paul II Catholic High School after late St. Pope John Paul II.

Athletics
John Paul II offers 11-man football, volleyball, cross country, men's and women's basketball, men's and women's soccer, swimming, track, golf, tennis, baseball, softball, and skeet shooting. It also has a cheer team, dance team and drumline.

External links
 School Website

Notes and references

Catholic secondary schools in Texas
High schools in Comal County, Texas
Educational institutions established in 2009
2009 establishments in Texas